Ahun is a commune in the Creuse department in the Nouvelle-Aquitaine region in central France.

Geography
It was the Roman site of Acitodunum, an important town on the route between Limoges and Clermont-Ferrand.

Population

Sights

 The viaduct carrying the railway 57m over the river, built by Lloyds and Nordling in 1864.
 The church of St.Sylvain, dating from the twelfth century.
 Three fifteenth century chateaux.

Personalities
 Saint Silvanus of Ahun (Silvain), martyred and buried in the village.
 Jean Auclair, politician.

See also
Communes of the Creuse department

References

External links
 Ahun on the Quid website 

Communes of Creuse
Lemovices
County of La Marche